Šenbric ( or ) is a settlement in the Municipality of Velenje in northern Slovenia. The area is part of the traditional region of Styria. The entire municipality is now included in the Savinja Statistical Region.

History
Šenbric was created as a separate settlement in 1982 by combining parts of the settlements of Hrastovec and Šmartinske Cirkovce.

Church
The local church from which the settlement gets its name is dedicated to Saint Brice ( or Bric) and belongs to the Parish of Velenje–Saint Martin. It is a Late Gothic building that was extensively rebuilt in the 18th century.

References

External links
Šenbric at Geopedia

Populated places in the City Municipality of Velenje